"Eple" ("Apple") is a song by Norwegian electronica duo Röyksopp, released as their second single. In 2003, it was re-released as the duo's third single from their debut album Melody A.M..

Commercial use 
The song's title comes from the Norwegian word for apple. The song was licensed by Apple and used as the introduction music for the Mac OS X v10.3 Setup Assistant. It was also used on Sky One's gaming show Gamezville as background music during the opening of the show. The track is also used as background music on the UK television programme The Kevin Bishop Show, in which a man called Gary in one of its sketches pretends to be a radio announcer, only to the annoyance of his girlfriend.

A small snippet of the song also is used for the station ID for American public television station KLRU, as well as for their identical production logo featured at the end of their productions such as Austin City Limits.

The single was used to accompany a television TestCard in the UK during 2001.

The song is the background music heard in a video made by Volvo called "Vision 2020" in which it showed off future semi truck concepts.

The now-defunct German music channel MTV2 Pop used a snippet of this song to introduce the commercial breaks.

The song is mainly based on a melody contained in Bob James' song "You're as Right as Rain" in his 1975 album Two. The cover of "Two" depicts a golden hand holding an apple.

Track listings

2001 release
UK CD WALLD071
 "Eple" (Edit) – 3:35
 "Eple" (Bjørn Torske Remix) – 6:52
 "Röyksopp's Night Out" – 7:30

UK 12" WALLT071
 "Eple" – 3:52
 "Eple" (Bjørn Torske Remix) – 6:52
 "Röyksopp's Night Out" – 8:08

2003 re-release
UK CD 1 WALLD080
"Eple" (Edit) – 3:35
"Eple" (Fatboy Slim Remix) – 3:56
"Eple" (Shakedown Remix) – 6:43

UK CD 2 WALLD080V
"Eple" (Edit) – 3:35
"Eple" (Boris and Michi's Eplistic-Scratch-Attack) – 7:16
"Eple" (Black Strobe Remix) – 6:10
"Eple" (Video) – 3:35

UK 12" 1 WALLT080
"Eple" – 3:52
"Eple" (Shakedown Remix) – 6:43
"Eple" (Fatboy Slim Remix) – 5:48

UK 12" 2 WALLT080X
"Eple" – 3:52
"Eple" (Black Strobe Remix) – 6:10
"Eple" (Boris and Michi's Eplistic-Scratch-Attack) – 7:16

Response
The single was first released in 2001 and re-released in 2003. In the UK the single managed to reach #16 on the UK Singles Chart.

Charts

References

2001 singles
2003 singles
Röyksopp songs
2001 songs
Songs written by Svein Berge
Songs written by Torbjørn Brundtland
Wall of Sound (record label) singles
Astralwerks singles